The Reagan coalition was the combination of voters that Republican Ronald Reagan assembled to produce a major political realignment with his electoral landslide in the 1980 United States presidential election. In 1980, the Reagan coalition was possible because of Democrat Jimmy Carter's losses in most social-economic groups. In 1984, Reagan confirmed his support by winning nearly 60% of the popular vote and carried 49 of the 50 states.

The Reagan Democrats were Democrats before the Reagan years and afterwards, but who voted for Reagan in 1980 and 1984 and for George H. W. Bush in 1988, producing their landslide victories. They were mostly white socially conservative blue-collar workers who lived in the Northeast and were attracted to Reagan's social conservatism on issues such as abortion and to his hawkish foreign policy. They did not continue to vote Republican in 1992 or 1996, so the term fell into disuse except as a reference to the 1980s. The term is not generally used to describe the Southern whites who permanently changed party affiliation from Democrat to Republican during the Reagan administration and they have largely remained Republican to this day.

Stan Greenberg, a Democratic pollster, analyzed white, largely unionized auto workers in suburban Macomb County, Michigan, just north of Detroit. The county voted 63% for John F. Kennedy in 1960 and 66% for Reagan in 1984. He concluded that Reagan Democrats no longer saw Democrats as champions of their middle class aspirations, but instead saw it as being a party working primarily for the benefit of others, especially African Americans and the very poor. 

The Reagan coalition began to fall apart after Reagan was ineligible for reelection in 1988. George H. W. Bush, Reagan's vice president, ran in 1988 and won the election over Democrat  Michael Dukakis, but lost over 5 million votes and 100 electoral votes that Reagan won four years prior. In 1992, President Bush faced a competitive primary competition with Pat Buchanan, still winning the Republican nomination with 72% of the vote. Bush went on to lose the general election against Democrat Bill Clinton, with exit polling showing that George Bush retained 66% of the Republican vote while Bill Clinton won 12% and Ross Perot, an independent candidate, won 21%. In 1996, Republican Bob Dole lost to President Clinton, taking 68% of the Republican vote, improving on President Bush's margin, while President Clinton took 23% and Ross Perot 7%.

Voter demographics 

 Source: CBS News/The New York Times interviews with 12,782 voters as they left the polls as reported in The New York Times, November 9, 1980, p. 28. 1976 data are from CBS News interviews.

See also 

 New Deal coalition
 Conservative coalition
 Obama coalition

Further reading
 Ehrman, John. The Eighties: America in the Age of Reagan. (2005).
 Ferguson Thomas, and Joel Rogers, Right Turn: The Decline of the Democrats and the Future of American Politics 1986. 
 Germond, Jack W. and Jules Witcover. Blue Smoke & Mirrors: How Reagan Won & Why Carter Lost the Election of 1980.  1981. Detailed journalism.
 Greenberg, Stan. Middle Class Dreams: The Politics and Power of the New American Majority (1985).
 Jensen, Richard J., Steven L. Piott, Christopher C. Gibbs; Grass Roots Politics: Parties, Issues, and Voters, 1854-1983 Greenwood Press, 1983.
 Nelson Michael ed. The Elections of 1984 1985.
 Patterson, James T. Restless Giant: The United States from Watergate to Bush vs. Gore. (2005), standard scholarly synthesis. 
 Pemberton, William E. Exit with Honor: The Life and Presidency of Ronald Reagan (1998).
 Troy, Gill. Morning in America: How Ronald Reagan Invented the 1980s (2004). Study of Reagan's image.

Political history of the United States
Presidency of Ronald Reagan